Padaek , sometimes known as padek, or Lao fish sauce (Lao: ປາແດກ), similar to pla ra in Thailand, is a traditional Lao condiment made from pickled or fermented fish that has been cured. It is thicker and more seasoned than the fish sauce more commonly seen throughout Thailand and Vietnam, often containing chunks of fish. The fermentation takes a long time, giving padaek an aroma similar to cheeses like Époisses. Unlike other versions of fish sauce in Southeast Asia, padaek is made from freshwater fish, owing to the landlocked nature of the former kingdom of Lan Xang. Padaek is used in many dishes, most notably tam maak hoong, a spicy Lao papaya salad.

See also

External links
Lao cuisine 
Lao food

Fish sauces
Umami enhancers
Lao cuisine